ABAV may refer to:

 ABAV, a relay station of ABV, the former local channel of Australian Broadcasting Corporation in Melbourne
 Abadina virus, a serotype of Palyam virus